Weekend Family is a French comedy streaming television series for children and teenagers, which is produced by Elephant International for the Walt Disney Company. The series premiered on February 23, 2022, on Disney+ in select countries.

In July 2022, the series was renewed for a second season.

Plot  
Fred is the fun and irresistible father of a very diverse family. As a perpetual joker, he tries to be a good father to his daughters Clara (15 years), Victoire (12 years) and Romy (9 years), for whom he only takes custody on weekends. Although his daughters' mothers love Fred, Laurence, Marie-Ange and Helena all had good reasons to leave him. The mothers are never far away, and neither is Stan, Fred's best friend. When Fred falls madly in love with Emmanuelle, a Québécois woman living in Paris who studied child psychology and is doing her doctorate, a new phase in life begins for both of them. Emmanuelle, who cannot always rely on the advice of her best friend Cora, has to break away from books and theory every weekend in order to get along with her new family, including Fred's ex-partners.

Cast

Episodes

Season 1 (2022)

Special (2022)

Release 
The series premiered on February 23, 2022, on Disney+ in France, Canada, Benelux, Scandinavia, Spain, Portugal, Australia, New Zealand, Singapore, Hong Kong and Taiwan (including Disney+ Hotstar in Indonesia, Malaysia and Thailand). The series debuted in the US, UK, Ireland and Italy on March 9, 2022.

Reception 
Joel Keller of Decider found the chemistry between the characters uplifting across their relationships, stating that it succeeds to avoid the portrayal of excessive and trite responses provided by other sitcoms, while complimenting the humor and the character development. Joly Herman of Common Sense Media rated the series 4 out of 5 stars, praised the show for its promotion of love and acceptance, found that the series depicts different positive role models, and complimented the diversity of the characters.

References

External links 
 
 Weekend Family Christmas Special on Disney+
 

Television shows filmed in France
2020s French comedy television series
French-language television shows
Disney+ original programming
Television series about families